Earthrise is a 2018 documentary by Emmanuel Vaughan-Lee. The film tells the story of the first image captured of the Earth from space in 1968, as recalled by the Apollo 8 astronauts. The film premiered at Tribeca Film Festival on April 21, 2018 and had its online premiere on the New York Times Op-Docs and the PBS Series, POV, on October 2, 2018. In 2018, it won the Audience Award at AFI DOCS and won Best Documentary Short at Raindance Film Festival. After airing on PBS, it was nominated for an Emmy for Outstanding Short Documentary at the 40th News and Documentary Emmy Award.

Synopsis 
Earthrise tells the story of the first image captured of the Earth from space in 1968. Told solely by the Apollo 8 astronauts, the film recounts their experiences and memories and explores the beauty, awe, and grandeur of the Earth against the blackness of space. This iconic image, Earthrise, had a powerful impact on the astronauts and the world, offering a perspective that transcended national, political, and religious boundaries. Told 50 years later, Earthrise compels us to remember this shift and to reflect on the Earth as a shared home.

Release 
The film premiered at Tribeca Film Festival on April 21, 2018 and had its online premiere on the New York Times Op-Docs and the PBS Series, POV, on October 2, 2018. On October 22, 2018,  the film will have its North American, TV broadcast premiere on POV. It has screened at festivals worldwide, including: Tribeca Film Festival, AFI Docs, Raindance Film Festival, Camden International Film Festival, Mill Valley Film Festival, DOC NYC, Rhode Island International Film Festival, Hot Springs Documentary Film Festival, Denver Film Festival, InScience International Science Film Festival Nijmegen, Jackson Hole Science Media Awards, and Original Thinkers, among others.

Reception 
POV called Earthrise “one of the most profoundly moving works of 2018. It speaks to our shared humanity, our challenging present, and our future”. It inspired the This American Life episode, and was featured in Act 1 of “The Not-So-Great-Unknown,” which aired August 25, 2018

References

External links 
Official website 
Earthrise at the Global Oneness Project
Earthrise at The New York Times
 Earthrise at POV

2018 documentary films